Green Alliance may refer to:
Green Alliance (think tank), a British think tank
Green Alliance (Colombia), a political party
Green Alliance (Ireland), former name of the Green Party in the Republic of Ireland and Northern Ireland
Green Alliance (Russia), a political party from 2012 to 2019
Green Alliance (Spain), an eco-socialist political party created in 2021

See also 
Green Algeria Alliance, an Islamist coalition of political parties in 2012